Justice Larson may refer to:

Edward Larson (Kansas judge), associate justice of the Kansas Supreme Court
Jerry L. Larson, associate justice of the Iowa Supreme Court
Martin M. Larson, associate justice of the Utah Supreme Court
Robert L. Larson, associate justice of the Iowa Supreme Court
Rolf Larsen, associate justice of the Supreme Court of Pennsylvania

See also
Judge Larson (disambiguation)